Let me Hear You Whisper is a popular Samoan song that has been covered by a multitude of artists that include Jo Stafford, Nephi Hannemann, the Samoan Surf Riders, Fatu, and many others. The song is a staple in Samoan music and has great popularity in the Pacific. The title in Samoan is "Tele i’a o le sami".

Background
The song was composed by Napoleon A. Tuiteleleapaga, Ray Evans, and Jay Livingston. In Samoan the song's title is "Tele I`a O le Sami". The song is so well known in Samoa that it would probably be one of the first a visitor to the islands will hear.

English versions
A version was recorded by Jo Stafford And David Hughes and backed with the Paul Weston Orchestra.

In film
Along with five other Samoan and Polynesian songs, it was included in the film Mr. Roberts.

Releases

English or Western styled versions
 Jo Stafford and David Hughes
 The Voices Of Walter Schumann

Hawaiian artists and other Polynesian artists
 Alfred Apaka and the Hawaiian Village Serenaders
 Sonny Chillingworth
 Lanakila's Polynesians  
 Bill Wolfgramm
 Daphne Walker

Samoan artists
 Fatu
 The Five Stars 
 Jerome Grey
 Nephi Hannemann and El Leon Orchestra
 The Samoan Surfriders
 the Yandall Sisters of NZ (Samoa Ea album 1965) Viking records

References

External links
 Huapala: Tele I`a O le Sami (Let Me Hear You Whisper) words

Polynesian songs
Year of song missing
Songs with music by Jay Livingston
Songs with lyrics by Ray Evans